Nina Waidacher (born 23 August 1992) is a Swiss ice hockey forward who plays internationally for the Switzerland women's national ice hockey team. She has represented Switzerland at the Winter Olympics in 2014 and won the bronze medal after defeating Sweden in the bronze medal playoff. She attends The College of St. Scholastica.

Personal life
Her sisters Isabel Waidacher and Monika Waidacher are also hockey players.

References

1992 births
Living people
Ice hockey players at the 2014 Winter Olympics
Ice hockey players at the 2018 Winter Olympics
Medalists at the 2014 Winter Olympics
Olympic bronze medalists for Switzerland
Olympic ice hockey players of Switzerland
Olympic medalists in ice hockey
College of St. Scholastica alumni
Swiss women's ice hockey forwards